The Sweetest Sounds - Ilse Huizina sings the Music of Richard Rodgers is a 2001 (see 2001 in music) album by Ilse Huizinga. It was nominated for an Edison Award.

Track listing
 "Getting to Know You" (Oscar Hammerstein II) – 5:05
 "Where or When" (Lorenz Hart) – 4:08
 "The Sweetest Sounds" (Richard Rodgers) – 6:29
 "If I Loved You" (Hammerstein) – 3:56
 "This Can't Be Love" (Hart) – 4:26
 "Falling In Love With Love" (Hart) – 4:18
 "A Ship Without a Sail" (Hart) – 6:47
 "Something Wonderful" (Hammerstein) – 6:07

All songs composed by Richard Rodgers, lyricists indicated.

Personnel

 Ilse Huizinga - vocals
 Erik van der Luijt - Piano
 Sven Schuster - double bass
 Steve Altenberg - drums
 Ed Verhoeff - guitars
 Jeroen Rol - trombone
 Enno Spaanderman - soprano saxophone
 Ferdinand Povel - tenor saxophone

Ilse Huizinga albums
2001 albums